Anders Blomquist may refer to:
 Anders Blomquist (cross-country skier)
 Anders Blomquist (footballer)

See also
 Anders Blomqvist, Swedish professor of pain research